Çubuklu is a neighbourhood in Beykoz district on the Anatolian side of the Bosphorus in İstanbul, Turkey. It was called Katangion (Κατάγγιον in Greek) in Byzantine times when it was a recreational area.

During the Ottoman era, some sultans such as Selim I (r. 1494–1511), Suleiman the Magnificent (r. 1520–1566), Ahmed I (r. 1603–1617) and  Ahmed III (r. 1703–1730) were particularly interested in Çubuklu. The grand vizier Nevşehirli Damat Ibrahim Pasha (in office 1718–1730) and some other high officials in the 19th century also contributed to its development. 

In the 19th century, Çubuklu became a popular residential area. Grand vizier Halil Rifat Pasha (i.o. 1895–1901) built five  yalıs (waterfront mansions) here for his sons. 

Abbas II of Egypt (r. 1892–1914), the last Khedive (Ottoman viceroy) of Egypt and Sudan, built the Khedive Palace on top of a hill overlooking Çubuklu. 

The Underwater Search and Rescue Command, which trains frogmen and divers for the underwater defense (SAS) and underwater offence (SAT) teams, as well as the Office of Navigation, Hydrography and Oceanography of the Turkish Navy, are situated in Çubuklu.

Şehir Hatları calls into the passenger ferry terminus in Çubuklu several times a day. It also runs the car ferry between Çubuklu and İstinye on the European side of the Bosphorus.

References

Neighbourhoods of Beykoz
Bosphorus